Sironi is a surname. Notable people with the surname include:

Andrea Sironi (born 1964), Italian academic
Luca Sironi (born 1974), Italian cyclist
Maria Bianca Cita Sironi (born 1924), Italian geologist and paleontologist
Mario Sironi (1885–1961), Italian Modernist painter

Italian-language surnames